Marc-André Barriault (born February 18, 1990) is a Canadian mixed martial arts (MMA) fighter who is currently signed to the Ultimate Fighting Championship's (UFC) Middleweight division. He previously competed with TKO Major League MMA where he won the TKO Middleweight Championship and the TKO Light Heavyweight Championship.

Background 
Barriault was born and raised in Gatineau, Quebec, Canada. He moved to Quebec City in 2011 to study. During this time he earned a DEC in dietetics and two culinary diplomas.

Mixed martial arts career

Early career
Barriault began competing in amateur mixed martial arts in 2012 under the tutelage of Sifu Patrick Marcil and finished with a record of 4–3. He also competed in FightQuest Amateur Combat in 2014 were he twice challenged for the FightQuest Middleweight Championship as well as the Vacant Hybrid Combat Middleweight Championship. After going professional in 2014 he competed in smaller promotions earning himself an impressive record of 11–1, During this time he managed to capture 3 Championships in 2 different promotions (TKO Major League MMA, Hybrid Combat). Having previously won both the TKO Middleweight and Light Heavyweight Championships when he was invited to sign with the Ultimate Fighting Championship in 2019.

Ultimate Fighting Championship
Returning to Middleweight Marc-André Barriault faced Andrew Sanchez in his promotional debut on May 4, 2019, at UFC Fight Night 151. He lost the fight via unanimous decision.

Barriault was next set to faced Krzysztof Jotko on July 7, 2019, at UFC 240. Barriault lost the fight via split-decision.

Barriault next faced Jun Yong Park on December 21, 2019, at UFC Fight Night 165. He lost the fight via unanimous decision.

Returning to action amidst the COVID-19 pandemic, Barriault faced Oskar Piechota on June 20, 2020, at UFC on ESPN: Blaydes vs. Volkov.  Barriault won the fight via TKO during the second round, earning him his first victory in the promotion.

On December 4, 2020, the UFC announced that Barriault had accepted a 6-month USADA suspension for testing positive in-competition for ostarine by the Nevada State Athlete Commission (NSAC) on June 20, 2020. Furthermore, Barriault's win was overturned to a no contest. After a thorough investigation into Barriault's positive test, including follow-up testing, an evaluation of the circumstances surrounding his positive tests, and finding no evidence of intentional use, USADA gave him a reduced suspension that it was consistent with low-level ostarine cases with evidence of contamination. He was eligible to fight again on January 21, 2021.

Barriault faced Abu Azaitar on March 27, 2021, at UFC 260. He won the fight via technical knockout in round three.

Barriault faced Dalcha Lungiambula on September 4, 2021, at UFC Fight Night 191. He won the fight via unanimous decision.

Barriault faced Chidi Njokuani on February 5, 2022, at UFC Fight Night: Hermansson vs. Strickland. He lost the fight via knockout in round one.

Barriault faced Jordan Wright, replacing Roman Kopylov, on April 23, 2022, at UFC Fight Night 205. He won the fight via a guillotine choke in round one.

Barriault  faced Anthony Hernandez on September 17, 2022, at UFC Fight Night: Sandhagen vs. Song. He lost the fight via a submission in round three.

Barriault faced Julian Marquez on March 4, 2023, at UFC 285. He won the fight via technical knockout in the second round.

Barriault is scheduled to face Eryk Anders on June 10, 2023, at UFC 289.

Personal life
Until his move to Florida in 2021, Barriault worked as a cook.

Championships and accomplishments
TKO Major League MMA
TKO Middleweight Champion (one time; former)
One successful title defense
TKO Light Heavyweight Champion (one time; former)
Hybrid Combat Promotions
Hybrid Combat Middleweight Champion

Mixed martial arts record

|-
|Win
|align=center|15–6 (1)
|Julian Marquez
|TKO (punches)
|UFC 285
|
|align=center|2
|align=center|4:12
|Las Vegas, Nevada, United States
|
|-
|Loss
|align=center|14–6 (1)
|Anthony Hernandez
|Technical submission (arm-triangle choke)
|UFC Fight Night: Sandhagen vs. Song
|
|align=center|3
|align=center|1:53
|Las Vegas, Nevada, United States
|
|-
|Win
|align=center|14–5 (1)
|Jordan Wright
|Submission (guillotine choke)
|UFC Fight Night: Lemos vs. Andrade
|
|align=center|1
|align=center|2:36
|Las Vegas, Nevada, United States
|
|-
|Loss
|align=center|13–5 (1)
|Chidi Njokuani
|KO (punches)
|UFC Fight Night: Hermansson vs. Strickland
| 
|align=center|1
|align=center|0:16
|Las Vegas, Nevada, United States
|
|-
|Win
|align=center|13–4 (1)
|Dalcha Lungiambula
|Decision (unanimous)
|UFC Fight Night: Brunson vs. Till
|
|align=center|3
|align=center|5:00
|Las Vegas, Nevada, United States
|
|-
|Win
|align=center|
|Abu Azaitar
|TKO (punches)
|UFC 260
|
|align=center|3
|align=center|4:56
|Las Vegas, Nevada, United States
|
|-
|NC
|align=center|11–4 (1)
|Oskar Piechota
|NC (overturned)
|UFC on ESPN: Blaydes vs. Volkov
|
|align=center|2
|align=center|4:50
|Las Vegas, Nevada, United States
|
|-
|Loss
|align=center|11–4
|Jun Yong Park
|Decision (unanimous)
|UFC Fight Night: Edgar vs. The Korean Zombie
|
|align=center|3
|align=center|5:00
|Busan, South Korea
|
|-
|Loss
|align=center|11–3
|Krzysztof Jotko
|Decision (split)
|UFC 240
|
|align=center|3
|align=center|5:00
|Edmonton, Alberta, Canada
|
|-
|Loss
|align=center|11–2
|Andrew Sanchez
|Decision (unanimous)
|UFC Fight Night: Iaquinta vs. Cowboy
|
|align=center|3
|align=center|5:00
|Ottawa, Ontario, Canada
|
|-
| Win
| align=center|11–1
| Adam Hunter
| KO (punches)
| TKO 44
| 
| align=center|1
| align=center|4:28
| Québec City, Québec, Canada
| 
|-
| Win
| align=center|10–1
| Brendan Kornberger
| KO (punch)
| TKO 43
| 
| align=center|2
| align=center|4:25
| Québec City, Quebec, Canada
| 
|-
| Win
| align=center| 9–1
| Strahinja Gavrilovic
| Decision (split)
| TKO 41: Champions
| 
| align=center| 5
| align=center| 5:00
| Montreal, Quebec, Canada
| 
|-
| Win
| align=center| 8–1
| Todd Stoute
| Decision (split)
| TKO 40: Dénouement
| 
| align=center| 3
| align=center| 5:00
| Montreal, Quebec, Canada
| 
|-
| Win
| align=center|7–1
| Jo Vallée
| TKO (retirement)
| TKO 39: Ultimatum
| 
| align=center| 2
| align=center| 5:00
| Quebec City, Quebec, Canada
| 
|-
| Win
| align=center| 6–1
| Yacine Bandaoui
| KO (punch)
| TKO 38: Ascension
| 
| align=center| 1
| align=center| 3:54
| Montreal, Quebec, Canada
| 
|-
| Win
| align=center| 5–1
| Strahinja Gavrilovic
| Decision (split)
| Hybrid Pro Series 5
| 
| align=center| 3
| align=center| 5:00
| Montreal, Quebec, Canada
| 
|-
| Win
| align=center| 4–1
| Martin Leblanc
| TKO (punches)
| LAMMQ 5
| 
| align=center| 2
| align=center| 3:06
| Quebec City, Quebec, Canada
| 
|-
| Loss
| align=center| 3–1
| Jo Vallée
| Decision (split)
| Hybrid Pro Series 4
| 
| align=center| 3
| align=center| 5:00
| Montreal, Quebec, Canada
| 
|-
| Win
| align=center| 3–0
| James Kouame
| TKO (punches)
| LAMMQ 4
| 
| align=center| 1
| align=center| 1:19
| Quebec City, Quebec, Canada
| 
|-
| Win
| align=center| 2–0
| James Kouame
| KO (punch)
| Hybrid Pro Series 2
| 
| align=center| 1
| align=center| 3:50
| Gatineau, Quebec, Canada
| 
|-
| Win
| align=center| 1–0
| Paul Cressaty
| KO (punch)
| LAMMQ 3
| 
| align=center| 1
| align=center| 2:22
| Quebec City, Quebec, Canada
|
|-

See also
 List of Canadian UFC fighters
 List of current UFC fighters
 List of male mixed martial artists

References

External links
 
 

1990 births
Living people
Canadian male mixed martial artists
Canadian Jeet Kune Do practitioners
French Quebecers
Middleweight mixed martial artists
Mixed martial artists utilizing Jeet Kune Do
Sportspeople from Gatineau
Ultimate Fighting Championship male fighters
Doping cases in mixed martial arts
Canadian sportspeople in doping cases